Sir George Gifford (1552 – June 1613) was the member of Parliament for Morpeth in 1584 and Cricklade in the parliaments of 1597 and 1601.

References 

Members of the Parliament of England (pre-1707) for Cricklade
1552 births
1613 deaths
English knights
Lords of the Manor
English MPs 1584–1585
English MPs 1597–1598
English MPs 1601